Richard Goldstein may refer to:
Richard Goldstein (astronomer) (born 1927), American astronomer and planetary scientist
Richard Goldstein (writer, born 1942), former editor and writer for The New York Times who has written books on sporting and historical topics
Richard Goldstein (writer, born 1944), former writer for the Village Voice who has written books on music, gay and lesbian issues, and counterculture